The Leader of the Official Opposition in Ontario, officially Leader of His Majesty's Loyal Opposition, is the leader of the largest party in the Legislative Assembly of Ontario which is not part of the government. The current Leader of the Opposition is Marit Stiles, leader of the Ontario New Democratic Party, because the NDP won the second largest number of seats as a result of the 2022 election. This is the sixth time the CCF/NDP has formed Ontario's official opposition.

Ontario's first Leader of the Opposition was Edward Blake of the Ontario Liberal Party who held the position from 1869 until 1871 when he became Premier of Ontario (Archibald McKellar had previously led the Liberal Party in the legislature for two years, but was not formally recognized as opposition leader). Ten Leaders were Premier before after they served this post.

Archibald McKellar (Liberal) 1867-1869 was not formally recognized as opposition leader, but led the Liberal Party in the legislature.

List of opposition leaders 

1  The Liberals were recognized as the Official Opposition following the 1923 election by the governing Conservatives, despite the fact that the United Farmers of Ontario had more seats.  According to historian Peter Oliver, this was an arbitrary decision without basis in precedent or law.  Conservative Premier G. Howard Ferguson used as justification an announcement by UFO general secretary James J. Morrison that the UFO would be withdrawing from party politics, though Oliver argues that this was facetious logic.  UFO parliamentary leader Manning Doherty protested the decision, but to no avail.  (source: Peter Oliver, G. Howard Ferguson: Ontario Tory, (Toronto: University of Toronto Press, 1977), p. 158.)

2  From 1930, the Liberal Party was led by Mitchell Hepburn, but Sinclair continued as Leader of the Opposition as Hepburn did not seek a seat in the legislature until the 1934 general election which made him Premier.

3  Until 1954, the Liberals were led from outside the legislature by Walter Thomson with Oliver as acting Leader of the Opposition. Oliver led the party in his own right (for a second time) from 1954 until 1958.

4  Interim Liberal leader following the personal defeat of Wintermeyer in the 1963 provincial election until Thompson's election as leader.

5  Interim Liberal leader of the party following the resignation of Stuart Smith.

6  Interim Liberal leader of the party following the personal defeat of Premier David Peterson in the 1990 election.

7  Elston became interim Liberal leader when Nixon resigned from the legislature to accept a federal appointment. Elston stepped down in November when he decided to be a candidate at the Liberal leadership convention.

8  Interim Liberal leader between resignation of Elston and election of McLeod.

9  John Tory was chosen as leader of the Ontario Progressive Conservative Party on September 18, 2004, but did not hold a seat in the legislature.  On September 28 the party announced that Bob Runciman would act as interim PC leader until Tory entered the legislature. Tory was elected to represent Dufferin--Peel--Wellington--Grey on March 17, 2005 and was sworn in as an MPP and leader of the opposition on March 29, 2005.

10  As Ontario PC leader John Tory did not win a seat in the 2007 election, Runciman served as Leader of the Opposition in the legislature.  (Tory had been running in the Don Valley West riding.)  After spending more than a year outside the legislature, Tory sought a seat in the  March 5, 2009 by-election in Haliburton—Kawartha Lakes—Brock.  He lost this by-election, and thereafter resigned as party leader. Runciman served as interim party leader as well as opposition leader until Hudak was chosen as the party leadership convention.

11  Wilson served as interim leader of the Progressive Conservative party following the resignation of Tim Hudak and continued to serve as Leader of the Opposition after Patrick Brown became party leader on May 9, 2015, until September when Brown won a seat in the legislature through a by-election.

12  Vic Fedeli was chosen interim leader of the PC Party by caucus on January 26, 2018, one day after Patrick Brown resigned due to allegations of sexual misconduct. He continued to serve as Leader of the Opposition after Doug Ford became party leader on March 10, 2018, as Ford did not have a seat in the legislature.

13 Peter Tabuns was chosen as interim leader by the NDP caucus on June 28, 2022, following the resignation of Andrea Horwath.

List of deputy opposition leaders

References 

Ontario
Politics of Ontario